Thomas de Ros may refer to:

Thomas de Ros, 4th Baron de Ros
Thomas de Ros, 8th Baron de Ros
Thomas de Ros, 9th Baron de Ros
Thomas Manners, 1st Earl of Rutland (12th Baron de Ros)